Emily Katherine Booth (born 26 April 1976), also known by her stage name Emily "Bouff" Bouffante, is an English actress and television presenter.

Early life
Booth was born 26 April 1976 in Chester, Cheshire, growing up in Hastings, East Sussex. Booth studied for three A levels and a BA in Media and Film degree at Goldsmiths College, University of London. While she was a student, she earned money busking playing the violin and sang on Eurotrash.

Career
Booth is known for her roles in cult films Pervirella, Cradle of Fear, Evil Aliens and the BAFTA nominated short film Inferno. She appeared in Quentin Tarantino and Robert Rodriguez's double header Grindhouse (2007) in the mock trailer, "Don't", by Edgar Wright.

Booth was also the host of several Channel 4 and satellite television shows. She co-presented and co-wrote the video-game review show, Bits for two years in 1999–2001. She was a segment presenter on Channel 4 flagship morning show, The Big Breakfast (2001), and presented on the gameshow Banzai for E4. Other shows she worked on are: L!VE TV's Blue Review, paintball-challenge show, Mission: Paintball (2001–2), Threesome (1999) and Demolition (2002).

Booth has presented several television programmes related to cult films, including OUT There on five (2002) and Shock Movie Massacre on Bravo.

Booth is a presenter on Eat Cinema, interviewing A-list Hollywood stars on The Buzz and hosting her own show, First Night Bites. She also hosted the now-defunct Quiz Night Live, a premium-rate call-in quiz show, shown on satellite/Freeview channel Ftn. She presents The Match on the XLeague.tvchannel. In 2007, she joined Zone Horror, where she works as a presenter and continuity announcer. In 2007, Booth became the face of the Horror Channel, and hosted a monthly highlights show, Horror Bites.

Booth was among the guests at the 2009 Festival of Fantastic Films in Manchester and announced the results of the Delta Film Award. She co-hosted the Frighten Brighton Classic Horror Film Festival in Brighton in August 2012.

She directed, produced and acted in a short film, Selkie, in 2014.

Personal life
She has two children.

Filmography

Television
 Forgot About The Drive-By: The Montell Jordan Story (2011) – presenter
 videoGaiden (2008)
 Bits (1999–2001) – writer and presenter
 The Big Breakfast: August 2001 – presenter
 outTHERE: season three (2002) – presenter (Eden)
 Shock Movie Massacre – presenter
 Blue Review – presenter
 Threesome (1999) – Eve
 Mission Paintball (2001–2002) – presenter
 Demolition (2002) – presenter
 Eat Cinema channel – presenter
 The Great Big British Quiz – presenter
 Quiz Night Live – presenter
 Make Your Play – presenter
 The Match – presenter
 Horror Channel – presenter/voiceover

References

External links
 Instagram
 

1976 births
Living people
Alumni of Goldsmiths, University of London
English television presenters
Actors from Chester
Actresses from Cheshire